Austroraphidia is an extinct genus of snakefly in the family of Baissopteridae. Austroraphidia fossils were described by Willmann in 1994. The genus was later described by Michael S. Engel in 2002. It has five sister taxa; Baissoptera, Cretinocellia, Cretoraphidia, Cretoraphidiopsis and Lugala. Its fossils were found at the Crato MNHN collection in Brazil, often known as the Cretaceous of Brazil. It contains one species, the extinct Austroraphidia brasiliensis, which was described by Nel et al. in 1990.

References

Raphidioptera
Cretaceous animals of South America
Early Cretaceous insects
Crato Formation
Cretaceous Brazil
Fossils of Brazil
Fossil taxa described in 1990
Fossil taxa described in 1994
Fossil taxa described in 2002